Law is a system of rules that regulate behavior.

Law, LAW, laws, or LAWS may also refer to:

Other common meanings
 Law (principle), universal principles that describe the fundamental nature of something
Law enforcement, sometimes referred to as "the law" or "lawmen""
 Statutory law, a written law created by one or more legislators

Places
 Law, Dundee, an extinct volcanic peak at the centre of the Scottish city of Dundee
 Law, South Lanarkshire, small town in Scotland
 Laws, California, United States, an unincorporated community

People
Law (surname)
Laws (surname)
Luo (surname) (羅), a Chinese surname commonly transliterated Law

Arts, entertainment, and media

Fictional characters
 Law & Order (G.I. Joe),  fictional characters from the G.I. Joe: A Real American Hero franchise
 Law (comics), fictional supervillain
 Marshall and Forest Law, two characters from the Tekken video game series
 Trafalgar D. Water Law, a character from the anime and manga One Piece

Music
 Law (band), a seventies funk / rock band from Ohio
 "Law", a song by David Bowie from his album Earthling
 "Law" (Yo Gotti song), by Yo Gotti featuring E-40 from his album The Art of Hustle

Other arts, entertainment, and media
 L.A.W. (comics), a limited series comic book published by DC comics
 Live Audio Wrestling, a professional wrestling call-in show
 Law, one axis of the alignment system used in the role-playing game Dungeons & Dragons
 Law (film), a 2020 Indian Kannada film

Weapons
LAW = Light anti-tank weapon
LAW 80, a British light anti-tank weapon
M72 LAW, an American light anti-tank weapon
NLAW, a Swedish light anti-tank weapon

Laser Weapon System or LaWS, a United States navy laser weapon
Lethal autonomous weapons system or LAWS, autonomous robots designed for military applications

Groups, organizations, companies
 Laredo Law, a defunct 2004 af2 arena football team in Laredo, Texas
 League of American Bicyclists, formerly known as the League of American Wheelmen
 League of American Writers
 Palestinian Society for the Protection of Human Rights (also known as LAW)

Science and mathematics
 Laws of science, established principles thought to be universal and invariable
 Law (stochastic processes), a specific form of law in the stochastic processes subfield of mathematics

Transportation and vehicles
 LAW, IATA airport code and FAA location ID for Lawton–Fort Sill Regional Airport, Comanche County, Oklahoma, United States
 LAW, station code for Landywood railway station, England
 , a destroyer which served in World War II
 Light Amphibious Warship (LAW) or Landing Ship Medium (LSM) (U.S. Navy)

Other uses
 Laws (dialogue), a dialogue by Plato
 Flight control law, a flight computer mode in a fly-by-wire aircraft.

See also

Law enforcement agency
 The Law (disambiguation)